Qilinyu rostrata is a "maxillate" placoderm from the late Ludlow epoch of Qujing, Yunnan, 419 million years ago.

Specimens and taxonomy
The holotype and paratype of Q. rostrata are two exquisitely preserved specimens both featuring a domed cranium and a curved rostrum presenting a "dolphin-like profile."

The researchers' cladistic diagram shows Q. rostrata as the sister taxon of Entelognathus, Janusiscus and the crown gnathostomes (i.e., bony and cartilaginous fishes and their descendants).

Evolutionary significance
Qilinyu rostrata, together with Entelognathus, demonstrates additional evidence that modern gnathostomes evolved from placoderms.

See also 

 Entelognathus
 Bianchengichthys
 Silurolepis

References

External links
 - Qilinyu rostrata: Silurian Fish from China Sheds Light on Jaw Evolution
 - Shocking Discovery: Human Jaws Could be Traced Back to Ancient Armored Fish
 - Fish fossil upends scientists’ view of jaw evolution

Placoderm genera
Silurian fish of Asia
Prehistoric animals of China
Placodermi enigmatic taxa
Paleontology in Yunnan
Transitional fossils
Fossil taxa described in 2016
2016 in China